Lost Worlds is a documentary television series by The History Channel that explores a variety of "lost" locations from ancient to modern times. These "great feats of engineering, technology, and culture" are revealed through the use of archaeological evidence, interviews with relevant experts while examining the sites, and CGI reproductions. These visual re-creations take the form of rendered 3D environments and photo manipulated overlays, allowing the "lost world" to be seen over its present-day state.

The pilot episode "Palenque: Metropolis of the Maya" was first aired on April 4, 2005. It was followed by 12 more episodes in 2006, and a further 19 episodes in 2007.

Episodes

Release on DVD 
Each episode was made available on DVD on its original air date. The first 13 episodes were released as a 4-DVD box set on January 30, 2007.

References

External links 
 

History (American TV channel) original programming
2000s American documentary television series
2005 American television series debuts
2007 American television series endings